Automotive Industries Ltd. (Ta'asiyot Rekhev Natzrat Ilit, AIL) is an Israeli automaker and major supplier of the Israeli Security Forces.

History
Located in Nazareth Illit, the company was founded in 1966 by Automotive Equipment Group as a plant for the assembly of cars and trucks. AIL has since increased its role in the vehicle manufacture, doing much of the work on several early Willys MB-derivatives, and the more recent M462 trucks and AIL Storm (Sufa) series of Jeep Wrangler-derivatives, and the AIL Desert Raider.

AIL was also an assembly-point for the Israel Defense Forces of Humvees, but US foreign aid guarantees caused contracts to be moved to plants in the United States. AIL is developing the Storm III which began production in August 2008.

Models

Tactical vehicles

Current production
AIL Storm – (1987–present)
AIL Storm III the current version 
HMMWV [assembly]
AIL Desert Raider – (1998–present)

Former production
Willys MB [assembly] – (1966–1983)
AIL Abir – (1966–1987)
AIL Abir II – a militarized Ram Truck 
AIL M325 Command Car – (1970 to 1993)

Armored vehicles
 Antelope – light multipurpose armored vehicle mounted on a RAM 550 truck chassis
 Avner – an armored AIL built body mounted on a RAM 550 truck chassis.

Projects
 AMSTAF – developed in conjunction with Automotive Robotic Industry Ltd. (ARI). The AMSTAF is an ARGO 6X6 based remote controlled light armored vehicle

References

External links
 AIL Official website 
Automotive Industries Ltd. on Global Auto Index
Automotive Industries Ltd. military products page 
civilian products on parent Automotive Equipment & Vehicles
Desert Raider at Israel Export & International Cooperative Institute

Car brands
Vehicle manufacturing companies established in 1966
Defense companies of Israel
Military vehicle manufacturers
Privately held companies of Israel
Truck manufacturers of Israel
1966 establishments in Israel